Juan Alejandro Abaurre (born September 11, 1972 in Mendoza, Argentina) is a former Argentine footballer who played as a forward for clubs in Argentina, Switzerland and Chile.

Teams
 Godoy Cruz 1990–1991
 Racing Club 1991
 FC Basel 1992–1993
 Godoy Cruz 1994–1997
 Palestino 1997–1998
 Godoy Cruz 1998–2002
 Olimpo 2002–2003
 Quilmes 2003
 San Martín de Mendoza 2003–2004
 Godoy Cruz 2005–2006
 Independiente Rivadavia 2006
 Deportivo Guaymallén 2007

Titles
 Godoy Cruz Antonio Tomba – 1990 Liga Mendocina de Fútbol
 Godoy Cruz Antonio Tomba – 1993/94 Torneo del Interior
 Godoy Cruz Antonio Tomba – 2005 Torneo Apertura B Nacional

External links
 

1972 births
Living people
Argentine expatriate footballers
Argentine footballers
Association football forwards
Independiente Rivadavia footballers
Gimnasia y Esgrima de Jujuy footballers
San Martín de Mendoza footballers
Racing Club de Avellaneda footballers
Godoy Cruz Antonio Tomba footballers
Quilmes Atlético Club footballers
Olimpo footballers
Club Deportivo Palestino footballers
Deportes Concepción (Chile) footballers
Expatriate footballers in Chile
Sportspeople from Mendoza, Argentina